Petrus Josephus Hubertus "Pierre" Cuypers (16 May 1827 – 3 March 1921) was a Dutch architect. His name is most frequently associated with the Amsterdam Central Station (1881–1889) and the Rijksmuseum (1876–1885), both in Amsterdam. More representative for his oeuvre, however, are numerous churches, of which he designed more than 100. Moreover, he restored many monuments.

Biography 

Cuypers was born in Roermond, the son of a church painter, and grew up in surroundings in which interest for art was encouraged. After he studied at the urban college in Roermond, he moved to Antwerp in 1844 to study architecture at the Royal art academy. He was taught by Frans-Andries Durlet, Frans Stoop and Ferdinand Berckmans, all pioneers of the neo-Gothic architecture in Belgium. Cuypers was a good student; in 1849, he gained the Prix d'Excellence of the academy.

After a tour in the German Rhineland, he returned to Roermond, where he was appointed a town architect in 1851. In 1852, he opened a workshop where ecclesiastical art was manufactured.

Cuypers' ecclesiastical work was initially strongly influenced by 13th century French architecture and by the writings of his friends Eugène Viollet-le-Duc and J. A. Alberdingk Thijm. Cuypers built many churches throughout the Netherlands, in which the French influence played a prominent role. From 1870 onwards Cuypers' style became more influenced by the native Gothic styles of the Netherlands as well as Gothic styles from other countries like Norway and Italy. He also experimented with centralizing ground-plans and other non-conventional layouts. In this second part of his career he built some of his best work. After 1883 he was assisted by his son Joseph Cuypers in much of his work.

Cuypers led many restorations. His conceptions concerning restorations has been frequently criticized; restoration often implied that the building was awfully damaged, but Cuypers tried to satisfy an idealized image of the style or the idea how the original builders had intended a building to be rather than to preserve the architectural evolution of the building. An early example of this is the extensive restoration of the Munster Church in Roermond, where Cuypers replaced original towers with new ones. From 1875 he led the restoration of the eastern front of the Mainz Cathedral, which he executed according to his own plans in Romanesque style. In doing so, he created as an opposite pole to the western tower group the high, gothic likely eastern tower helmet, replacing a bell floor and the Moller iron cupola. 

Pierre Cuypers was the uncle of Eduard Cuypers who trained in his practice as a young man. Other relatives who became architects are his grandsons Pierre Cuypers jr. and Theo Taen.

Cuypers was a practising Roman Catholic and a member of the Lay Dominicans. As such, he was buried in the Dominican habit.  He died in his home town of Roermond, aged 93.

Bibliography

A. J. C. van Leeuwen, Pierre Cuypers architect (1827–1921), Zwolle-Amersfoort-Zeist, 2007.
H. Berens (ed.), P.J.H. Cuypers (1827–1921). Het complete werk, Rotterdam, Nederlands Architectuurinstituut, 2007.
A. J. C. van Leeuwen, De maakbaarheid van het verleden. P. J. H. Cuypers als restauratiearchitect, Zeist-Zwolle, 1995.

Major works 
Nijmegen railway bridge (Built 1875-1879)
Rijksmuseum Amsterdam (Built between 1876–1885)
Amsterdam Central Station (1881–1889)
Castle de Haar (1892–1907)
St. Martinuskerk, Groningen (Built 1895, Demolished 1982)

Special festivities in connection with the "Cuypers year" 
The year 2007-2008 has been proclaimed "Cuypersjaar" (Cuypers year) in the Netherlands. A great number of activities and exhibitions are organized around this theme including an exhibition on Cuypers' architecture at the Netherlands Architecture Institute in Rotterdam and Maastricht.

See also
Chief Architect of the Netherlands
Hotel Polen fire

References

1827 births
1921 deaths
Dutch architects
Dutch ecclesiastical architects
Dutch Roman Catholics
People from Roermond
Royal Academy of Fine Arts (Antwerp) alumni
Commanders of the Order of the Netherlands Lion
Recipients of the Royal Gold Medal
Railway architects
Gothic Revival architects